Graeme Milton is an American mathematician, currently distinguished professor at University of Utah and also previously the Eisenbud Professor at Mathematical Sciences Research Institute in 2010 and also a full professor at Courant Institute of Mathematical Sciences.

Biography
Graeme W. Milton received B.Sc. and M.Sc degrees in Physics from the University of Sydney in 1980 and 1982 respectively. He received a Ph.D degree in Physics from Cornell University in 1985, after which he joined the Caltech Physics Department as a Weingart Fellow from 1984 to 1986. He then joined the Courant Institute of Mathematical Sciences where he stayed until 1994 when he joined the faculty at the University of Utah as a full professor. He has received numerous honors and awards, including an Alfred P. Sloan Fellowship and a Packard Fellowship, both in 1988. He was an Invited Speaker for the 1998 International Congress of Mathematicians. He was awarded the Ralph E. Kleinman Prize in 2003 by the Society for Industrial and Applied Mathematics for “his many deep contributions to the modeling and analysis of composite materials.”

References

Living people
University of Utah faculty
20th-century American mathematicians
Cornell University alumni
Fellows of the Society for Industrial and Applied Mathematics
Applied mathematicians
Sloan Research Fellows
Courant Institute of Mathematical Sciences faculty
University of Sydney alumni
1956 births
21st-century American mathematicians
Australian emigrants to the United States